The Hesper and Luther Little were two trade route schooners that were left abandoned in Wiscasset, Maine. Both ships were built in Massachusetts in the 1910s, and wound up under one owner by 1932. Despite efforts to make use of the two schooners, this last owner went bankrupt and died not long afterwards. Both ships were essentially abandoned where their owner had left them in Wiscasset where they were disintegrated over time. Despite efforts to save the ships as tourist attractions, both were demolished in 1998 having been finally reduced to piles of debris by the elements. Various pieces of the former ships were saved by the public from the local landfill while others are now displayed in museums.

History
The Hesper, and Luther Little were both built in or near Somerset, Massachusetts in the later half of the 1910s, each having a different career. Both ships had donkey engines that were used for things like the capstan, and hoisting the anchor, but no auxiliary power. Their usage was primarily to ship coal and lumber, but by the mid 1920s new steam powered vessels were making cargo sailing ships obsolete. One by one the ships were taken out of service, and found their way to Wiscasset where they were placed up for auction. The two ships were purchased by Frank Winter in 1932. Winter was an entrepreneur who had also bought the Wiscasset and Quebec Railroad in order to operate a Boston-to-Wiscasset coal and lumber business. He had the idea to have the ships bring coal north to Wiscasset, and bring lumber back to the south. The railroad was to be used to bring lumber, and coal to the interior parts of Maine. This idea never came to pass though as Winter's business experienced financial setbacks that led to the railway being ripped up in 1934 in order to pay debts owed. Winter later died in 1936 leaving the two schooners abandoned to the elements in Wiscasset Harbor.

As the ships deteriorated at different rates, the Hesper suffered the most from the decay having been set on fire at least twice. There were efforts made to try and preserve the ships, but the town of Wiscasset did not want to spend the money to do so. For decades the ships sat where they had been left becoming a tourist attraction as they were highly visible from U.S. Route 1. Both ships kept their shapes until the mid 1990s when they substantially disintegrated. They were both demolished, and disposed of in the late 1990s after a storm had destroyed the remains. The public was allowed to scavenge the remains at the landfill; what was left was run through a wood chipper.

Hesper
The Hesper was built as a four-masted schooner in 1918 by Crowninshield Shipbuilding, which was located in Fall River, Massachusetts. She was primarily built for offshore trading as requested by "Rogers & Webb of Boston". Her launch on July 4, 1918 did not go smoothly as the event was delayed by a faulty slipway. Hesper's early career involved crossing the Atlantic Ocean frequently as she brought coal to Lisbon, and case oil to France. She made her way back to the United States in turn with fertilizer from Venezuela. Her career was also marked by several notable incidents which added to her faulty launch. Hesper left Norfolk Virginia on February 27, 1920 with a cargo of bituminous for Boston. She never made it to the city as a powerful gale tore her sails apart and drove her off course. She was ultimately able to make it to Portland, Maine for repairs. In February 1925, she was grounded while entering Boston harbor, but was freed with the assistance of tugs. By 1927, Hesper was laid up in Rockport, Maine where her final incident took place in the following year. This event occurred sometime in January 1928 when she broke free of her moorings during a Nor'easter causing her beach nearby on shore. Hesper was freed, and eventually sailed to Portland where she would remain out of service until she was sold at auction. Winter bought the Hesper for $600 (USD) in 1932, and had her towed to Wiscasset where she arrived in September of that year.

Hesper had her masts cut down, and was hauled closer to shore with the Luther Little in 1940. Her first major fire occurred when her aft deckhouse was intentionally burned to celebrate the end of World War II. Despite the damage it was possible to board Hesper as late as the 1960s, as a few explorers were even able to access her lower decks. Hesper's next and last major fire occurred on July 4, 1978 when some teenagers threw a sparkler on board. During this time a salvager was able to make off with a wooden plank of the ship that said "Hesper" on it possibly saving it from destruction. The Wiscasset fire department was finally able to control the fire which preserved what was left of the ship. Her burnt out hulk eventually disintegrated into a pile of debris by 1994 as her bow and sides collapsed into the mud. Hesper's end came in 1998 when it was decided by the town to demolish what was left of the ships.

Luther Little

The Luther Little was built as a four-masted schooner in December 1917 by the Read Brothers Company, which was located in Somerset, Massachusetts. Like the Hesper she was also built for offshore trading as requested by "Rogers & Webb of Boston". Both ships used small coal boilers, but Luther Little's also provided heat and hot water to the ship’s forward and main cabins in addition to mechanical work. When Luther Little was launched she is said to have been the first boat of its kind launched from Fall River in more than 40 years (c. 1878). She was launched fully rigged as at the time there was an increased demand for ships. Luther Little had a brief bit of excitement in her career, when in June 1918 her crew managed to rescue two balloonists who had crashed in the Atlantic Ocean off the coast of Delaware. Other than this event, she was used in the coal and lumber trade which took her as far south as Haiti. It was here in 1920 where she was grounded with an overloaded cargo of logwood that was bound for Pennsylvania. She was able to be pulled off and freed after spending two weeks stuck in place with non-extensive damage done. As time passed it became harder and harder to find cargo as the Age of Sail drew to a close in favor of steamships. Luther Little wound up either tied up to a dock or laid at anchor more than she worked. She was eventually taken out of service for good and laid up by 1925. She sat idle until she was purchased by Frank Winter in 1932, who had her towed alongside the Hesper in Wiscasset.

After Winter's death, the Luther Little was hauled closer to shore along with Hesper in 1940. Both ships were forgotten about until 1965 when the Wiscasset Industrial Development Committee looked into possibly restoring the Luther Little as a tourist attraction. The plan would have involved burning her to the waterline in order to preserve the ship, but this was never done. During this decade it was possible for a few explorers to access her lower decks along with the Hesper. By the 1970s her deck house fixtures had been stripped, and water had made its way into the 200 ft cargo hold. The next effort to save the Luther Little came in 1978 when a group known as Friends of the Wiscasset Schooners hoped to get enough private donations to stabilize the old ships. Luther Little's rear mast which had been leaning to the stern collapsed in the following year due to an earthquake. Her stern section gave way next, and by 1981 the group abandoned their efforts to save the ships. By early 1991, her bow had partly collapsed, and during the same year she was set on fire by a flare gun. Although the fire was put out, Luther Little continued to deteriorate rapidly. At some point in time braces were added to Luther Little's three remaining masts in order to delay her demise. These masts finally came crashing down during a storm in 1995, and three years later she was demolished along with the Hesper. These remains went to a local landfill where they were later picked through by the public (see section below).

Legacy
Luther Little's lower masts and a single topmast were saved by the town of Wiscasset as the debris was removed in 1998. The remaining piles were then hauled off to the local landfill where they sat undisturbed until the spring of 2001. During this time, the Maine Department of Environmental Protection ordered the town to move the ships to a more secure location due their possible environmental impact. Wiscasset chose instead to open the piles to the public to take what they wanted. Various remains of the Hesper and Luther Little were saved as people picked through their debris at the local landfill. Decades of time in the mud had turned some of the oak wood used for the schooners into a shiny black 'cement" like material. The wood turned out to be workable as it was made into unique items by various craftsmen. A Brunswick based table company was able to salvage enough wood to make a dining room table, pieces were picked out for use by a clock maker, and kitchen cabinets were fashioned from the salvaged wood for use in a Wiscasset home. The Maine Maritime Museum saved a few pieces for their museum in Bath, Maine, and wood from the schooners is also on display in the Somerset Historical Society. Remains of the ships in the form of deteriorated iron such as the bollards are still at the local landfill according to a report done in July 2015. Anything of value had already been stripped from the ships long ago as they sat in Wiscasset Harbor. Its unknown if any of these items have survived and are now in the hands of clueless owners.

In popular culture
In 1985, folk singer/songwriter Gordon Bok wrote a song called Wiscasset Schooners. Included in the group singing were Lois Lyman (the song's author), and her husband. Bok included the song on his albums Schooners, and Harbors of Home.

See also
Cora F. Cressey - another Maine schooner that was abandoned in the 1930s and lasted into the 1990s.
List of schooners - for a dynamic list.

Notes

References

Schooners of the United States
Ships built in Somerset, Massachusetts
Wiscasset, Maine
1917 ships
1918 ships
Maritime incidents in 1936